Juni Vibeke Dahr (born 29 June 1953) is a Norwegian actress. She was born in Oslo, and is the sister of film director and producer Eva Dahr.

References

1953 births
Living people
Norwegian film actresses
Norwegian stage actresses
Norwegian television actresses
Actresses from Oslo